Bin Shimada (born November 20, 1954) is a Japanese actor, voice actor and narrator affiliated with the talent management firm Aoni Production.

Filmography

Television animation
 Urusei Yatsura (1981-10-14), Tobimaro Mizunokoji
 Galactic Gale Baxingar (1982), Kay Malorn
 Bismark (1984), Richard Lancelot
 Fist of the North Star (1985), Yuda
 Mobile Suit Zeta Gundam (1985), Paptimus Scirocco
 Saint Seiya (1985), Merak Beta Hägen
 Ranma ½ (1989), Sentarō Daimonji, An-Man
 Moomin (1990), Anton
 Shima Shima Tora no Shimajirō (1993), Mimirin's father, Dot
 Sailor Moon (1993-03-06–1995), Yuichiro Kumada – second, third, and fourth seasons
 Mahojin Guru Guru (1995), Yanban
 You're Under Arrest (1996-10-05; 2001; 2007), Ken Nakajima
 Dr. Slump (1998), King Nikochan – 2nd series
 Yu-Gi-Oh! (1998), Akaboshi
 One Piece (1999-), Wapol, Foxy, Shimotsuki Yasuie
 Inuyasha (2000-10-16), Kōtatsu the Hell Painter
 Kiddy Grade (2002), Mistelle
 Naruto (2002-10-03), Kamikiri
 The Galaxy Railways (2003), Leon
 Rumic Theater (2003), Mr. Fuha
 Angel Heart (2005), Doc
 Chibi Maruko-chan (2010), Tomozou Sakura Replaced Takeshi Aono 
 Digimon Xros Wars (2010), Omegamon, Starmon, Jijimon, Tactimon
 Nyaruko: Crawling with Love (2012), Nodens
 Kaito Joker (2014), Silver Heart
 World Trigger (2014), Eizō Netsuki
 Dragon Ball Super (2017), Dispo, Kanpaari
 GeGeGe no Kitarō (2018), Konaki-Jijii and Nurikabe
 Wave, Listen to Me! (2020), Yoshiki Takarada

Unknown date
 Beet the Vandel Buster, Hazan
 Blue Gender, Ted
 Bomberman B-Daman Bakugaiden, Chibīdabon
 The Brave Fighter of Legend Da-Garn, Tadashi Nemoto, Big Lander, Land Bison
 Chōsha Raideen, Spectre
 Chūka Ichiban, Admiral Li's subordinate, adult Zhang, others
 Cyborg Kuro-chan, Būrusu
 Detective Conan, Atsuhiko Wakizaka, Mineto Kanaya
 Don't Leave Me Alone, Daisy, Kin-chan
 Dragon Ball GT, Suguro, Sonpara
 Dragon Ball Z, West Kaiō, Cell Jr.
 Dragon Ball Kai, Kami (after Takeshi Aono), Bobbidi
 F-Zero Falcon Legend, Silver Nielsen
 Firestorm, Steve Johnson
 Future GPX Cyber Formula, Jackie Gudelhian, Akira Hiyoshi
 Guardian Angel Getten, Producer
 Genesis Climber Mospeada, Stick Bernard
 Genji Tsūshin Agedama, Tsuriban, Kacchi, Modem, Akira Fukuzawa
 Genki Bakuhatsu Ganbaruger, (Rikiya Ryūzaki (Red Ganba), Erudoran
 Ginga Reppū Baxinger, Kei Malone
 Gintama, Gengai Hiraga – Enchousen onwards
 Heavy Metal L-Gaim, Anton, Chai Char, Muto, Mesh
 Hero Bank, Kurayasu Kōshō
 Highschool! Kimen-gumi, Ichirō Shinjitsu
 Infinite Ryvius, Luxen Hojo, Radan
 Itazura Na Kiss, Shigeo Aihara
 Jushin Liger, Doru Commando
 Kindaichi Case Files, Seiji Kobayashi
 Kirby: Right Back at Ya!, Quixano
 Kiteretsu Daihyakka, Kikunojō Hanamaru, Ryū, Rokusuke, Shiro Karasu
 Kūsō Kagaku Sekai Gulliver Boy, Baron Mangetsu
 Kyo kara Maoh!, Vinon
 Lassie, Hamilton, Carey-sensei
 Les Misérables: Shōjo Cosette, Mabeuf
 Marmalade Boy, Yōji Matsuura, Master
 Marude Dameo, Nūbō
 Mashin Eiyūden Wataru 2, Hanbunburugu Kyōdai(eldest brother), Ūrontī,Kamoshirēnu
 Metal Armor Dragonar, Karl Gainer, 1st Lt. Zin
 Mobile Suit Gundam ZZ, 2nd Lt. Niki, Nie Gihren
 Nanatsu no Umi no Tico, Enrico
 Nangoku Shōnen Papuwa-kun, Tōhoku Miyagi
 Nintama Rantarō, Hemu Hemu, others Replace by: Ginzō Matsuo
 Nekketsu Saikyō Go-Saurer, Tarō Shirogane, Toshio Takagi, Erudoran 
 Petopeto-san, Tonio Fujimura
 Pokémon, Dr. Akihabara (episode Dennō Senshi Porygon)
 Robin Hood no Daibōken, Little John
 Robot Girls Z, Dr. Hell
 Saber Rider and the Star Sheriffs, Richard
 s-CRY-ed, Urizane, Biff(understudy)
 Sgt. Frog, 3M
 Shima Shima Tora no Shimajirō, Dot
 Slayers, Zangulus
 Sonic X, Bocoe, Chuck Thorndyke
 Space Runaway Ideon, Gyabarī Tekuno
 Spiral: Suiri no Kizuna, Suemaru Wataya
 Super Dimension Cavalry Southern Cross, Charles de Etouard
 Time Bokan 2000: Kaitou Kiramekiman, 
 Uchūsen Sagittarius, Toppī
 Ultimate Muscle II, Barrier-Free Man J, Dazzle
 Wild Knights Gulkeeva, Dansu 
 Yaiba, Kenjuro
 Yokoyama Mitsuteru Sangokushi, Sonken, Teiiku
 Yōyō no Neko Tsumami, Doc
 Yu-Gi-Oh! Duel Monsters GX, Gravekeeper's Chief
 Zettai Muteki Raijin-Oh, Tsutomu Kojima, Erudoran

Original Video Animation (OVA)
 Wicked City (1987), Airport Demon, Mr. Shadow's Thugs
 Crying Freeman (1988), Tsunaike
 Macross II (1992), Nexx
 Kishin Heidan (1993), Masatomo Sakaki
 You're Under Arrest (1994), Ken Nakajima
 Konpeki no Kantai (1998), Mototoki Hara, Naruto Kanchō
 Master Keaton (1998), Edgar Fisher

Unknown date
 B't X Neo, B't Halloween
 Detective Conan: Conan vs. Kidd vs. Yaiba: Hōtō Sōdatsu Daikessen!!, Kenjūrō Kurogane
 Future GPX Cyber Formula series, Jackie Gudelhian
 Kyokujitsu no Kantai, Tatsu Haramoto
 Mobile Suit Gundam 0080: War in the Pocket, Gabriel Ramirez Garcia
 Riki-Oh: The Wall of Hell, Riki-Oh Saiga
 Riki-Oh: Child of Destruction, Riki-Oh Saiga
 Saint Seiya Hades Chapter Sanctuary, Frog Zelos
 Tales of Symphonia, Rodyle – replaced Takeshi Aono

Theatrical Animation
 Urusei Yatsura 4: Lum the Forever (1986-02-22), Tobimaro Mizunokoji
 Dragon Ball Z: Broly – The Legendary Super Saiyan (1993), Broly
 Dragon Ball Z: Broly – Second Coming (1994), Broly
 Dragon Ball Z: Bio-Broly (1994), Bio-Broly
 Go! Go! Ackman (1994), Gordon
 Dragon Ball: The Path to Power (1996), General Blue
 You're Under Arrest: The Movie (1999-04-24), Ken Nakajima
 Asura (2012-09-29), Gisuke
 Yo-kai Watch Shadowside: Oni-ō no Fukkatsu (2017), Medama-Oyaji 
 Mazinger Z (2018), Professors Nossori 
 Dragon Ball Super: Broly (2018), Broly
 Drifting Home (2022), Yasuji Kumagaya
 Dragon Ball Super: Super Hero (2022), Broly
 One Piece Film: Red (2022), Monster

Unknown date
 Doraemon: Nobita and the Legend of the Sun King, Ketsuaru
 Doraemon: Nobita and the Robot Kingdom, Gonsuke
 Doraemon: Nobita in the Wan-Nyan Spacetime Odyssey, Secretary
 Doraemon: Nobita and the Winged Braves, Gūsuke's dad
 Dragon Ball: The Path to Power, General Blue
 One Piece: Episode of Chopper Plus: Bloom in the Winter, Miracle Sakura, Wapol
 Ultimate Muscle II, Dazzle
 Zeta Gundam A New Translation: Heirs to the Stars, Paptimus Scirocco
 Zeta Gundam A New Translation II: Lovers, Paptimus Scirocco
 Zeta Gundam A New Translation III: Love is the Pulse of the Stars, Paptimus Scirocco

Video Games
 Street Fighter II (1991), Ryu
 Dead or Alive (1996), Zack
 Dead or Alive 2 (1999), Zack
 You're Under Arrest (2001-03-29, PlayStation), Ken Nakajima
 Dead or Alive 3 (2001), Zack
 Dead or Alive Xtreme Beach Volleyball (2003), Zack
 The King of Fighters: Maximum Impact (2004), Hyena
 Bōkoku no Aegis 2035: Warship Gunner (2005), Hiroshi Asao
 Dead or Alive 4 (2005), Zack
 KOF: Maximum Impact 2 (2006), Hyena
 Dead or Alive Xtreme 2 (2006), Zack
 Dead or Alive: Paradise (2010), Zack
 Dead or Alive: Dimensions (2011), Zack
 Dead or Alive 5 (2012), Zack
 Dead or Alive 6 (2019), Zack

Unknown date
 Angelique: Sacria of Light and Darkness, Clavis, Guardian of Darkness
 Angelique: Tokimeki Treasure Chest, Clavis, Guardian of Darkness
 CR Hokuto no Ken Denshō (pachinko), Yuda
 CR Hokuto no Ken Tomo (pachinko), Yuda
 Dragon Ball Z video games (Budokai 3, Tenkaichi, Tenkaichi 2 and Tenkaichi 3), Broly
 Future GPX Cyber Formula series, Jacky Guderian, Akira Hiyoshi
 The Legend of Heroes III: Prophecy of the Moonlight Witch (Sega Saturn), Rōdi
 Kessen II, Cao Ren, Cheng Yu
 One Piece Grand Battle! 2, Wapol
 Policenauts, Dave Forrest
 Project Justice, Kurow Kirishima
 Summon Night Craft Sword Monogatari: Hajimari no Ishi, Enge
 Super Robot Wars series, Paptimus Scirocco, Nie Gihren, Anton Rando, Chai Char, Karl Gainer, 1st Lt. Zin, Gabriel Ramirez Garcia, Enemy Soldier, Kalo-Ran
 Tales of Legendia, Soron
 Tales of the World: Radiant Mythology, Widdershin
 Tales of Innocence, Oswald fan Kuruela
 Klonoa, Joka
 Infamous 2 (Japanese dub), Zeke Dunbar
 Tokyo Afterschool Summoners, Kurogane Kajiya

Tokusatsu
 Skyrider (1979-1980), Kamen Rider 2 (27 - 28, 52 - 54), Kamen Rider V3 (ep. 23, 27 - 28, 54)
 Skyrider Movie (1980) , Kamen Rider 2, Kamen Rider Stronger
 Kamen Rider Super-1 Movie  (1981), Kamen Rider 2
 Birth of the 10th! Kamen Riders All Together!! (1984), Kamen Rider Stronger
 Ultra Super Fight (1994), Narrator, Ultraman (ep. 1, 3, 5, 13), Alien Baltan (ep. 1), Ultraman Ace (ep. 2, 4 - 5, 12), Astromons (ep. 2, 4, 12), Eleking (ep. 2, 4), Bemster (ep. 2, 4, 8), Kemur Man, Alien Godra (ep. 4, 8) Delusion Ultraseven (ep. 5), Astra (ep. 6), Ultraman Leo (ep. 6, 12), Alien Pegassa (ep. 7, 10, 15), Alien Metron (ep. 7, 14), Ultraman Taro (ep. 8, 10, 15), Ultraseven (ep. 9, 11), Zetton (ep. 9, 11), Reconstructed Pandon (ep. 10, 12), Pandon (ep. 14), Woo (ep. 15)
 Hyakujuu Sentai GaoRanger (2001), Tire Org (ep. 5)
 Ninpuu Sentai Hurricaneger (2002-2003), Sixth Spear Satarakura (eps. 21 - 49, 51) (Voice), TV Announcer (ep. 50) (Actor)
 Ninpuu Sentai Hurricaneger: Shushutto the Movie (2002), Sixth Spear Satorakura
 Ninpū Sentai Hurricaneger vs. Gaoranger (2003), Sixth Spear Satorakura
 Tokusou Sentai Dekaranger (2004), Barisian Alpacic (ep. 24), Pyrian Korachek (ep. 40)
 Kamen Rider Hibiki Hyper Video (2005), Azure Wolf
 GoGo Sentai Boukenger (2006), Wicked Dragon Talong (ep. 27)
 Juken Sentai Gekiranger (2007), Confrontation Beast Baboon-Fist Hihi (ep. 24 - 25)
 Engine Sentai Go-onger (2009), Danger Cabinet-Director Chirakasonne (ep. 47)
 Samurai Sentai Shinkenger: The Light Samurai's Surprise Transformation (2010), Nanashi/Super Nanashi
 Tensou Sentai Goseiger: Epic on the Movie (2010), Desaopuda Alien Deinbaruto of the Morning Star
 Kaizoku Sentai Gokaiger (2011), Satorakura Jr. (ep. 25 - 26)

CD drama
 Haiyore! Nyarko-san (2009), Nodens

Unknown date
 Future GPX Cyber Formula series, Jacky Guderian
 Mirage of Blaze series 2: Saiai no Anata he, Narimasa Sassa
 Samurai Spirits (Dengeki CD Bunko), Haōmaru
 Street Fighter II: Shunrei Hishō Densetsu (Toshiba-EMI), Ryū
 Nanaka 6/17, Jinpachi Arashiyama

Live action voice over
Mark Hamill
Star Wars Episode IV: A New Hope (Luke Skywalker)
Star Wars Episode V: The Empire Strikes Back (Luke Skywalker)
Star Wars Episode VI: Return of the Jedi (Luke Skywalker)
Star Wars: The Force Awakens (Luke Skywalker)
Star Wars: The Last Jedi (Luke Skywalker)
Brigsby Bear (Ted Mitchum)
Child's Play (Chucky)
Star Wars: The Rise of Skywalker (Luke Skywalker)
Steve Carell
The 40-Year-Old Virgin (Andy Stitzer)
Evan Almighty (Evan Baxter)
Crazy, Stupid, Love. (Cal Weaver)
Seeking a Friend for the End of the World (Dodge Petersen)
The Way, Way Back (Trent)
Battle of the Sexes (Bobby Riggs)
Space Force (General Mark R. Naird)
 The Adventures of Pluto Nash, Felix Laranga (Luis Guzmán)
 Batman Forever, Edward E. Nygma/The Riddler (Jim Carrey)
 Bill & Ted's Bogus Journey, Bill S. Preston (Alex Winter)
 Cool Runnings, Sanka Coffie (Doug E. Doug)
 The Fan, Manny (John Leguizamo)
 Indiana Jones and the Temple of Doom, Kao Kan (Ric Young)
 Out of Sight, Chino (Luis Guzmán)
 Pee-wee's Big Adventure, Pee-wee Herman (Paul Reubens)
 Private School (1984 Fuji TV edition), Bubba Beauregard (Michael Zorek)
 Red Dawn, Daryl Bates (Darren Dalton)
 The Replacement Killers, Stan "Zeedo" Zedkov (Michael Rooker)
 Sniper (additional recording part), Thomas Beckett (Tom Berenger)
 Super Mario Bros. (1994 NTV edition), Luigi (John Leguizamo)
 The Three Stooges, Curly Howard (Will Sasso)
 Tucker: The Man and His Dream, Alex Tremulis (Elias Koteas)

Animation voice over
 All Dogs Go to Heaven as Itchy Itchiford (Dom Deluise)

References

 Nakagami, Yoshikatsu et al. "You're Under Arrest: Full Throttle". (December 2007) Newtype USA. pp. 48–49.

External links
 Official agency profile 
 
 

1954 births
Living people
Aoni Production voice actors
Japanese male video game actors
Japanese male voice actors
Male voice actors from Niigata Prefecture
People from Niigata (city)
20th-century Japanese male actors
21st-century Japanese male actors